Shooting at the 1976 Summer Olympics in Montreal comprised seven events, all mixed. For the first time ever, a woman won an Olympic medal in shooting: Margaret Murdock caught the silver in the three positions event. Lanny Bassham and Murdock tied for the first place, but Murdock was placed second after review of the targets. Bassham suggested that two gold medals be given, and after this request was declined, asked Murdock to share the top step with him at the award ceremony. Women had no separate shooting events at the time and were allowed to compete with men. Murdock became the first woman to win an Olympic medal in shooting.

Events

Participating nations

A total of 344 shooters, 336 men and 8 women, from 60 nations competed at the Montreal Games:

Medal count

References

External links
Official Olympic Report

 
1976 Summer Olympics events
Olympics
Shooting competitions in Canada